Patrick Barrett (born 22 July 1993) is an Irish professional footballer who plays as a defender for League of Ireland Premier Division club Shelbourne. Ultimate tin roofer. Alright shapeooo

Career
From 2013 to 2017, Barrett played for a variety of Scottish and Irish clubs. On 17 November 2017 Barrett signed to FC Cincinnati in the United Soccer League to play in the 2018 season. He made his professional debut for the club in a regular season away match against Indy Eleven on 2 May 2018.

St Patrick's Athletic

2021 Season
On 23 February 2021 Barrett returned to Ireland, signing for St Patrick's Athletic, managed by his former captain at Dundalk, Stephen O'Donnell. He made his debut for the club in the opening game of the season, a 1–1 draw away to Shamrock Rovers in a Dublin derby on 19 March 2021. He scored his first goal for the club on 23 July 2021 in a 6–0 win over Bray Wanderers in the FAI Cup, curling his shot into the top corner from 25 yards. On 28 November 2021 Barrett was in the starting XI in the 2021 FAI Cup Final, as his side defeated rivals Bohemians 4–3 on penalties following a 1–1 draw after extra time in front of a record FAI Cup Final crowd of 37,126 at the Aviva Stadium.

2022 Season
Despite offers from other clubs and rumours of a return to Dundalk following former head coach Stephen O'Donnell, Barrett committed his future to the club by signing a long term deal stating on the club's website, "There was plenty of interest and a lot of things I had to weigh up on holidays. I loved my first year at Pat's, it's the club where I've been at my happiest from a personal point of view, both on the field and off the field. I really enjoyed last year, and it's not something I wanted to move away from." Barrett struggled with injuries and fitness throughout the season which resulted in just 3 appearances in all competitions over the season before on 12 December 2022, it was announced that Barrett had left the club by mutual consent.

Career statistics

Honours

Club
Dundalk
League of Ireland Premier Division (2): 2015, 2016
FAI Cup (1): 2015
EA Sports Cup (1): 2017
President of Ireland's Cup (1): 2015
Leinster Senior Cup (1): 2015

Waterford
League of Ireland First Division (1): 2017

FC Cincinnati
USL Championship Eastern Conference (1): 2018

St Patrick's Athletic
FAI Cup (1): 2021

Individual
PFAI First Division Team of the Year (1): 2014

References

External links
 Paddy Barrett's biography at FC Cincinnati

Living people
1993 births
Republic of Ireland association footballers
Association football defenders
Association footballers from County Waterford
FC Cincinnati (2016–18) players
Waterford F.C. players
Dundee United F.C. players
Galway United F.C. players
Dundalk F.C. players
Indy Eleven players
St Patrick's Athletic F.C. players
Preah Khan Reach Svay Rieng FC players
Republic of Ireland expatriate association footballers
Irish expatriate sportspeople in Scotland
Irish expatriate sportspeople in the United States
Irish expatriate sportspeople in Cambodia
Expatriate footballers in Scotland
Expatriate soccer players in the United States
Expatriate footballers in Cambodia